Žlobin Raion, or Žlobinski Raion, is a district of Gomel Region, in Belarus.

Notable residents 
Uladzimir Sodal (1937, Mormal village – 2015), journalist and historian

References

Districts of Gomel Region